Heikki "Hexi" Riihiranta (born October 4, 1948 in Helsinki, Finland) is a retired professional ice hockey player who played in the SM-liiga and World Hockey Association.

Playing career

Career in Finland
Riihiranta started out his career as a Forward in Helsinki club HIFK but was moved to play Defence by then HIFK Player-Coach and former NHL'er Carl Brewer.

Riihiranta had a good career in Finland and was one of the premier players for the National Team at his time.

Career in WHA
Heikki Riihiranta was one of the first Finns move to play in North America.

Riihiranta played for 3 full seasons in a Canadian WHA team, Winnipeg Jets, and won the Avco World Trophy with them in 1976.

After his retirement as a player in 1983, he was inducted into the Finnish Hockey Hall of Fame in 1991 for his achievements as a player.

Non-Playing Career

Team Manager for Finnish National Team
In 1993, Heikki Riihiranta was named as the Team Manager for Finnish National Ice Hockey Team.

During his time, Riihiranta worked with 3 different Head Coaches. The coaches were: Pentti Matikainen, Curt Lindström and Hannu Aravirta.

Riihiranta had his finest moment when he shed tears in the players bench after Finland won the World Championships over Sweden in 1995.

Riihiranta retired from his position after the 2003 Ice Hockey World Championship's.

External links

1948 births
Living people
Finnish ice hockey defencemen
HIFK (ice hockey) players
Ice hockey players at the 1972 Winter Olympics
Olympic ice hockey players of Finland
Ice hockey people from Helsinki
Winnipeg Jets (WHA) players
Ice hockey players with retired numbers